is a professional go player.

Biography
Takehisa is a student of top title holder Cho Chikun. In 1997 he became a professional at the Nihon Ki-in institute in Japan. He quickly moved up the ranks, being promoted to 3 dan just the next year. In 2003 he reached a total number of 200 wins as a professional go player. In 2006 he won his first title, the Shinjin-O. His opponent in the final was Ko Iso. Takehisa took the first game, but Ko would come back and take the second. The title came down to the last game, and Takehisa won by 5.5 points.

Titles

External links
GoBase Profile
Nihon Ki-in Profile (Japanese)

1980 births
Japanese Go players
Living people
Sportspeople from Nagasaki Prefecture